J. Miles Dale (born 1961) is a Canadian producer and director of film and television, best known for producing the critically acclaimed film, The Shape of Water, for which he won the Academy Award for Best Picture at the 90th Academy Awards. He is a regular collaborator of director Guillermo del Toro.

More recently, Dale has been formed a creative partnership with Netflix.

Early life
Dale was born in Toronto, Ontario, to British-born Canadian jazz musician Jimmy Dale. Dale attended Bayview Glen School from 1965 to 1968. In 1968, his father moved the family to Hollywood where he worked as a music director for The Smothers Brothers Show, The Andy Williams Show and The Sonny & Cher Comedy Hour. The family returned to Toronto in the mid-1970s, and Miles graduated from Jarvis Collegiate Institute. He attended the University of Toronto for a year and later transferred to the University of British Columbia before dropping out to join the film industry.

Filmography

Film

Television 

(citation: https://www.imdb.com/name/nm0197703/?ref_=fn_al_nm_1)

Awards and nominations

References

External links
 

Living people
Film producers from Ontario
Film directors from Toronto
Producers who won the Best Picture Academy Award
Canadian expatriates in the United States
University of Toronto alumni
University of British Columbia alumni
1961 births